Ballinhassig railway station was on the Cork and Bandon Railway in County Cork, Ireland.

History
The station opened on 12 June 1851. Regular passenger services were withdrawn on 1 April 1961.

On 1 November 1851 the station was renamed Ballinhassig & Kinsale Road and on 27 June 1863 it was renamed Ballinhassig.

References

Further reading 
 

Disused railway stations in County Cork
Railway stations opened in 1849
Railway stations closed in 1961
1849 establishments in Ireland

Railway stations in the Republic of Ireland opened in 1849